The Indian River is a river on the Caribbean island of Dominica. It flows to the Caribbean Sea between the town of Portsmouth and the village of Glanvillia. It is the widest river in Dominica.

Indian River boat rides are one of tourist attractions of Dominica. Some of the scenes of Pirates of the Caribbean: Dead Man's Chest are filmed at Indian River.

See also
List of rivers of Dominica

References
 Map of Dominica
  GEOnet Names Server
 Water Resources Assessment of Dominica, Antigua and Barbuda, and St. Kitts and Nevis

External links
 Photos from Indian River

Rivers of Dominica